State Route 903 (SR 903) is a  state highway located entirely in Kittitas County, Washington, United States. The highway links Lake Cle Elum to Roslyn, Cle Elum and SR 970, which provides access to Interstate 90. The highway has existed as a numbered highway since at least 1939, however a highway linking Lake Cle Elum to Cle Elum has existed since 1897. The Washington State Department of Transportation (WSDOT) had previously considered turning control of the highway over to Kittitas County, however this never happened, and WSDOT continues to maintain the highway.

Route description 
SR 903 begins at an intersection with SR 970 just north of the Interstate 90 (I-90) / SR 970 interchange, headed westerly into the town of Cle Elum. Before entering Cle Elum, the highway intersects its spur route, SR 903 Spur, which serves as a bypass for travelers on SR 970 who wish to avoid the main interchange of SR 903. The roadway parallels  a railroad line before it terminates in South Cle Elum. The highway jogs to the north for a block before turning back west along Second Street, exiting the town and turning northwesterly. SR 903 continues through a roundabout before entering the town of Roslyn. The highway continues through town, turning southwesterly on Nevada Street, before turning back northwesterly at Seventh Street, exiting Roslyn. The highway continues through Ronald before terminating at the boundary of the Wenatchee National Forest, east of Cle Elum Lake. The roadway continues northerly however as Salmon La Sac Road.

The Washington State Department of Transportation (WSDOT) measures traffic counts, measured in terms of annual average daily traffic, with as few as 1,100 cars at the northern terminus, and as many as 7,400 cars just past the intersection at Pennsylvania Avenue in Roslyn.

History 

The current highway was numbered Secondary State Highway 2E (SSH 2E) since at least 1939, though maps show a roadway following roughly the same alignment in existence since at least 1897. During the 1964 state highway renumbering, the designation was changed from SSH 2E to SR 903. WSDOT was considering dropping SR 903 from the state highway system and turning over the highway to Kittitas County in 1992; however, the idea was quickly dropped. The roundabout at Bullfrog was first proposed in 2002, and was estimated to cost $1.2 million, paid for by Suncadia Resort. The roundabout opened to traffic sometime between May 7 and July 15, 2005. Completed in August 2007, WSDOT repaved  of highway between Cle Elum and the National Forest boundary for a cost of $2 million.

Major intersections

Spur route 

The spur route serves as a short connector allowing travelers on SR 970 who wish to continue west towards Cle Elum along SR 903 to bypass the main junction between SR 903 and SR 970 just north of I-90. On average, 3,000 cars-per-day travel over the spur route.

References

External links

Highways of Washington State

Transportation in Kittitas County, Washington
903
903